Disporum longistylum, called the long-styled disporum, is a species of flowering plant in the fairy bells genus Disporum, native to Assam, Tibet, and central China. Its cultivar 'Night Heron' has gained the Royal Horticultural Society's Award of Garden Merit.

References

longistylum
Flora of Assam (region)
Flora of North-Central China
Flora of South-Central China
Flora of Tibet
Plants described in 1984